The 2015–16 Highland Football League  started on 25 July 2015 and ended on 7 May 2016.

League table

Results

Promotion play-offs

As Highland League champions, Cove Rangers played Edinburgh City, champions of the 2015–16 Lowland League, over two legs. Cove Rangers lost the first leg at home 0–3 and drew 1–1 away, losing 1–4 on aggregate. Therefore, Cove Rangers will remain in the Highland League for the 2016–17 season.

References

Highland Football League seasons
5
Scottish